Turčiansky Peter is a village and municipality in Martin District in the Žilina Region of northern Slovakia.

History
In historical records the village was first mentioned in 1309.

Geography
The municipality lies at an altitude of 439 metres and covers an area of 4.618 km². It has a population of about 319 people.

External links
http://www.statistics.sk/mosmis/eng/run.html

Villages and municipalities in Martin District